The Stirling and Bridge of Allan Tramway was a tramway between Stirling and Bridge of Allan from 1874 to 1920.

History

The company began construction in May 1874 and the line was ready for opening by 27 July. Tramcars were obtained from the Tramway Car and Works Company of Glasgow.

An extension was opened on 29 January 1898 to St. Ninians which added just over a mile of route to the tramway.

The horse drawn tramcars were supplemented by a secondhand vehicle obtained from the Edinburgh and District Tramways in 1902. This was modernised in 1913 when a petrol engine was inserted.

Closure

Services ended on 20 May 1920.

References 

1874 establishments in Scotland
Tram transport in Scotland

1920 disestablishments in Scotland